Lisowo  (formerly ) is a village in the Administrative District of Gmina Płoty, within Gryfice County, West Pomeranian Voivodeship, in northwestern Poland.

For the history of the region, see History of Pomerania.

References

Lisowo